Henri Édouard Dallier (20 March 1849 – 21 December 1934) was a French organist.

Career
Born in Reims, Dallier studied organ with César Franck at the Conservatoire de Paris and obtained First prize in organ and fugue in 1878. He became "titulaire du grand orgue" of Saint-Eustache in 1879 and in 1905 he succeeded Gabriel Fauré as the organist of la Madeleine.

Compositions
Cantilène, piano, 1874
Six grands préludes pour la Toussaint, Op. 19, organ (Leduc, 1891)
Contemplation, violin, piano/harp and organ (Leduc, 1891)
Messe nuptiale (Leduc, 1894)
In Deo caritas, organ (Leduc, 1895)
Symphony No.1, Op. 50 (1908) 
Cinq invocations, organ (Lemoine, 1926)
Fête joyeuse, trumpet and piano
Fantaisie-Caprice, oboe and piano

External links
 
 Detailed biography, Prix de Rome
 Portrait

1849 births
1934 deaths
Musicians from Reims
French classical organists
French male organists
Prix de Rome for composition
Conservatoire de Paris alumni
Academic staff of the Conservatoire de Paris
Recipients of the Legion of Honour
Male classical organists